Schleedorf is a municipality in the district of Salzburg-Umgebung in the state of Salzburg in Austria.

Geography
The municipality lies in the Flachgau on the road from Köstendorf to Mattsee. Katastralgemeinden are Schleedorf, Engerreich, and Wallsberg. A further subdivision is Grabenmühle.

References

Cities and towns in Salzburg-Umgebung District